These are the results for the boys' doubles event at the 2014 Summer Youth Olympics.

Orlando Luz and Marcelo Zormann of Brazil won the gold medal, defeating Karen Khachanov and Andrey Rublev of Russia in the final, 7–5, 3–6, [10–3].

Ryotaro Matsumura and Jumpei Yamasaki of Japan won the bronze medal, defeating Kamil Majchrzak and Jan Zieliński of Poland in the bronze-medal match, 6–4, 0–6, [10–4].

Seeds

Main draw

Draw

References 
 Main draw

Boys' doubles